"Since I Met You Baby" is an American rhythm and blues song written and recorded by pianist Ivory Joe Hunter. The song, which Hunter recorded in 1956, became an American standard, and saw renewed popularity in 1969 when country music artist Sonny James released his hit version.

Song background
Hunter had already tasted major success with popular and rhythm and blues audiences with songs such as "I Almost Lost My Mind". He moved to Atlantic Records by 1954, and around that time wrote "Since I Met You Baby."

The song, a 12-bar blues, was described by AllMusic critic Steve Huey as "a masterpiece of smooth, bluesy elegance" and "decidedly removed from the tide of raucous rock & roll sweeping the country." In fact, compared to many of the other uptempo, rock-beat songs of the period, the song was "augmented by a wordless vocal choir (supervised by Ray Ellis who also did the orchestral arrangement) that's strongly reminiscent of traditional pop recordings of the period," wrote Huey. Saxophonist Jesse Powell provided the harmony on the second verse.

"Since I Met You Baby" topped the Billboard magazine Rhythm and Blues Records chart for three weeks in 1957, and became Hunter's only Billboard Hot 100 entry, stopping at No. 12.

Atlantic licensed the recording to Quality Records in Canada and EMI's Columbia label in the UK.

Hunter was presented with a gold record for this song which was awarded during his appearance on The Ed Sullivan Show.

Cover versions

Sonny James
Sonny James had major success covering pop standards, both of the present time and of the past, during the 1960s. In 1969 alone, he had reached the top of the Billboard Hot Country Singles chart with two such covers: "Only the Lonely" and "Running Bear."

"Since I Met You Baby" was James' third cover song released during 1969. Supposedly recorded live (the song's introduction and fade out features a cheering audience), the audience was added to the studio recording. James took the song to No. 1 on the Hot Country Singles chart that October. His 13th chart-topper overall, the song was his ninth consecutive country No. 1 in an eventual string of 16 straight chart-toppers in as many single releases, dating between 1967 and 1971.

Other artists
Mindy Carson had a chart version of the song in 1957.

Sam Cooke included this song on his 1961 album, My Kind of Blues.

The Spencer Davis Group recorded a version on their second UK album The Second Album (1966), Fontana TL5295.

Country-Tejano artist Freddy Fender had a major country hit in the mid-1970s with a Spanish version of the song, "Desde Que Conozco", which featured in John Sayles's 1996 movie, Lone Star.

Countless other artists have recorded "Since I Met You Baby," and they represented a wide range of genres. A partial listing includes Neil Young, Pat Boone, Sandy Posey, Bill Anderson, Paul Evans, Mickey Gilley, Bruce Channel, Sam Cooke, Willy DeVille, José Feliciano, Oscar Harris, Narvel Felts, B.B. King, Wanda Jackson, Solomon Burke, Jerry Lee Lewis, Dean Martin, Lou Rawls, Gary Moore, Bobby Vee, Black Joe Lewis and the Honeybears, and Johnny "Guitar" Watson.

Chart performance

Ivory Joe Hunter

Mindy Carson

Bobby Vee

Sonny James

Freddy Fender

B.B. King And Gary Moore

References

1956 singles
1969 singles
Sonny James songs
Freddy Fender songs
Songs written by Ivory Joe Hunter
Song recordings produced by Ahmet Ertegun
Song recordings produced by Jerry Wexler
1956 songs
Atlantic Records singles
Capitol Records singles
Song recordings produced by George Richey